Apatura ilia, the lesser purple emperor, is a species of butterfly native to most of Europe and east across the Palearctic. It is named for its similarity to the purple emperor butterfly.

Description 
The upper side of the wings is dark brown, with metallic blue-violet hues in the male, and it has a clear postdiscal band on the hind wing and several light spots on the fore wing. These clear areas can be presented in  two different aspects; they are white on the butterflies of the nominal form ilia, and clear fawn in the form clytie. For both forms, the fore wing also has an orange-coloured ocellus, which makes differentiating the species from Apatura iris possible. A similar ocellus is present on the hind wing in both species.
The reverse side of the fore wing is brown and the back of the hind wing is dull brown with, as in A. iris, an orange ocellus centered in black.

Mounted specimens

Biology
A. ilia flies from May to September in one or two generations. It feeds on tree honeydew and flies near their summit. It goes down only to find moisture, honeydew shrubs or excrement.
The eggs are laid singly on leaves. The caterpillar host plants are willows and poplars, in particular Populus tremula and Populus nigra. A. ilia either pupates in the same year or winters as a young caterpillar, becoming brown, stuck to a twig. The greyish green chrysalis hangs from a leaf or twig.

Ecology and distribution
It is present in most of Europe and across the Palearctic to Japan. However, it is absent from the European Mediterranean islands and the southernmost regions, from the majority of Spain and Portugal, southern Italy and Greece, as well as Nordic countries (Denmark, Sweden, Norway, Poland, northern Germany and the British Isles).

This species belongs to a group of 35 European butterflies for which ecologists had sufficient data to assess the possible movements of their range in Europe. Of these 35 butterflies studied, Apatura ilia was an exception - it is the only species that has seen the northern limits of its area move slightly down to the south while its southern limit remained stable.

Cultural references
It is named in the Classical tradition, Ilia was the mother of Romulus and Remus in Roman mythology.
In March 1987 DPR Korea issued a postage stamp depicting Apatura ilia.

References

External links
Apatura ilia at Native Butterflies of Europe
Apatura ilia at ButterflyCorner.net

Apaturinae
Butterflies of Asia
Butterflies of Europe
Butterflies described in 1775